Antonio Gutiérrez could refer to:
Antonio Gutiérrez de la Fuente (1796–1878), president of Peru in 1829
Antonio Gutiérrez de Humana, member of the Humana and Leyva expedition of 1594 or 1595
Antonio Gutiérrez Limones (b. 1963), Spanish Socialist politician
Antonio Gutiérrez de Otero y Santayana (1729–1799), lieutenant general in the Spanish army
Antonio Gutiérrez y Ulloa (1771–1831), Spanish colonial administrator 
Similar
António Guterres (b. 1949),  prime minister of Portugal  (1995–2002), United Nations Secretary-General (since 2017)